Eucalyptus diversifolia, commonly known as the soap mallee, coastal white mallee, South Australian coastal mallee, or coast gum is a species of mallee that is endemic to an area along the southern coast of Australia. It has smooth bark, lance-shaped adult leaves, flower buds in groups of between seven and eleven, white to creamy yellow flowers and cup-shaped fruit.

Description
It has smooth, mainly cream-coloured and grey bark. Flowering occurs between July and September or December to January and the flowers are white to cream-yellow flowers. The seeds are smooth glossy brown and pyramidal.

Taxonomy
Eucalyptus diversifolia was first formally described by the botanist Aimé Bonpland in 1814 and the description was published in his book Description des Plantes Rares cultivees a Malmaison et a Navarre.

Three subspecies were described in 1987 by Ian Wright and Pauline Ladiges and two of these are recognised by the Australian Plant Census (APC):
 Eucalyptus diversifolia subsp. hesperia has a short skirt of rough bark at the base and fruit that is usually smaller than in subspecies diversifolia.

This species is part of the Eucalyptus subgenus series Diversiformae, a group of mallees that all have adult leaves held erect, buds with a single unscarred operculum and pyramidal seeds. The other species in this series include E. erectifolia, E. platydisca, E. pachyloma, E. todtiana, E. lateritica, E. dolorosa and E. buprestium.

The specific epithet (diversifolia) is derived from the Latin words diversus meaning "different" and folium meaning "leaf".

Distribution
Soap mallee grows in soils derived from limestone, often on exposed headlands. Subspecies diversifolia is found on the Eyre and lower Yorke Peninsulas, on Kangaroo Island in South Australia and eastwards to the Cape Nelson State Park with an isolated population near Aireys Inlet in Victoria, but it is absent from the Nullarbor Plain in far western South Australia. Subspecies hesperia occurs west of the Nullarbor Plain between Eucla, Caiguna, Cocklebiddy and Madura.

Uses
In wheatbelt regions it is also beneficial as the tree will reduce salinity, give shade to stock, act as a windbreak and reduce erosion.

Gallery

See also

List of Eucalyptus species

References

diversifolia
Mallees (habit)
Myrtales of Australia
Eucalypts of Western Australia
Plants described in 1814
Taxa named by Aimé Bonpland
Flora of South Australia